ImMature is a 2019 Indian Hindi-language coming-of-age romantic comedy web series produced by The Viral Fever. The series is directed by Prem Mistry and written by Abhishek Yadav, Nishaad Zaveri, Suprith Kundar and Divyansh Palia. It stars Omkar Kulkarni, Rashmi Agdekar, Chinmay Chandranushush and Visshesh Tiwari in the lead roles. The show follows a one-conflict-per-episode format that ties into the protagonist Dhruv's larger quest to befriend his love interest Chhavi.

The music and background score for the series is composed by Vaibhav Bundhoo, with cinematography handled by Jerin Paul and Sahil Verma was the editor. It was premiered in April 2018 at the first edition of Canneseries International film festival, before being globally released on 20 February 2019 on Indian streaming platform MX Player as an original series. The series opened to positive response from audiences, and after the overwhelming reception, the makers announced for a renewal of the second season.

As of 2022, It's Season 2 has also been started on Amazon Prime Video

Premise 
Dhruv is 16, and in a hurry to grow up. With a little help from his school friends, the wannabe bad-boy Kabir, and the color-blind Master Susu,but doesn't know it Susu, Dhruv sets out to woo the first crush of his life, the feisty, out-of-his-league class topper, Chhavi. Venturing out of their childhood, in their last years of school, the trio find their first drink, pick their first fight and mend their first broken heart.

Cast

Main cast

 Omkar Kulkarni as Dhruv Sharma
 Rashmi Agdekar as Chhavi Upadhya
 Kannika Kapur as Chhaya (Season 2)
 Chinamay Chandraunshush as Kabir Bhuller
 Visshesh Tiwari as Master Susu
 Vikranth Thanikanti as God

Recurring cast

 Dilip Meralal as Golewala
 Komal Chhabaria as Dhruv's mom
 Sameer Saxena as Dhruv's dad (cameo)
 Paltu as Old lady on Walker
 Jitendra Kumar as Drama Teacher
 Vijay Rawal as Karan
 Sachin Negi as Nukkad
 Ranjan as Ranja
 Biswapati Sarkar as Hindi Teacher
 Nidhi Singh as Sonam Miss
 Himika Bose as Nandini/Natasha
 Gopal Datt as Vice Principal
 Nikhil Vijay as Shantanu Mehra
 Badri Chavhan as Waiter at the bar
 Nidhi Bisht as Aishwarya Miss
 Pradnya as kid with Shantanu
 Jaimin Panchal as student in class

Episodes

Soundtrack 

Immature's original soundtrack album from the web series is composed and written by Vaibhav Bundhoo, who worked as the norm composer for the original projects of The Viral Fever. The soundtrack album featuring eight tracks were recorded by Bundhoo, Neha Rathod, Maria Roe Vincent, El Fé Choir and Pallak Ranka and was released on 10 March 2019.

Production 

The show was shot at various locations in Mumbai (Including - Hansraj Morarji Public School ) .

Release 
ImMature was premiered first on the Canneseries, an international series festival held at Cannes on 11 April 2018, thus becoming the first ever web series from The Viral Fever to be premiered at this festival. After several months, Sameer Saxena, the creative producer of TVF announced that the digital distribution rights of the film were sold to MX Player. The trailer for the series was released on 14 February 2019. MX Player released first two episodes on 18 February 2019, ahead of the scheduled date on 20 February, and the remaining episodes were released on the same date. In April 2019, it was announced that the makers had renewed for a second season.

Reception 
Sowmya Rao of Scroll.in reviewed "Immature's strong suit is its ability to tap into the elements that make adolescence ripe for dramatisation. This it does by looking at ordinary characters and trading glamour for a glimpse of school life that is far closer to reality [...] The series nails the endless catastrophising over small setbacks and worldview that's both self-centred and self-deprecating ... [It] is like an instant noodles formula: quick, easy, enjoyable but ultimately transient." Devasheesh Pandey of News18 wrote "The makers have effectively limited themselves to painting a target on frivolous boys, who eventually end up having their way. But in that there is a stark absence of a character that stands counter to the flippant story line. However, the performances of the lead actors are funny up to a point that it does not go overboard."

References

External links 
 

2019 web series debuts
TVF Play Shows
Indian comedy web series
MX Player original programming